The 14219 / 20 Varanasi Lucknow Intercity Express is an Intercity Express train belonging to Indian Railways - Northern Railway zone that runs between Varanasi Junction & Lucknow NR in India.

It operates as train number 14219 from Varanasi Junction to Lucknow NR and as train number 14220 in the reverse direction serving the state of Uttar Pradesh.

It is one of 3 trains that run between Varanasi Junction to Lucknow NR, the others being 14227/28 Varuna Express & 14203 / 04 Varanasi Lucknow Intercity Express.

Coaches
The 14219 / 20 Varanasi Lucknow Intercity Express has 1 AC Chair Car, 12 General Unreserved & 2 SLR (Seating cum Luggage Rake) Coaches. It does not carry a Pantry car coach.
 
As is customary with most train services in India, Coach Composition may be amended at the discretion of Indian Railways depending on demand.

Service

As the average speed of the train is below , as per Indian Railways rules, its fare does not include a Superfast surcharge.

Routing
The 14219 / 20 Varanasi Lucknow Intercity Express runs from Varanasi Junction via Bhadohi, Janghai Pratapgarh, Amethi, Rae Bareli Junction to Lucknow NR.

Traction
As the route is yet to be fully electrified, it is hauled by a Lucknow based WDM 3A for its entire journey.

Operation
14219 / 20 Varanasi Lucknow Intercity Express runs every day except Sunday in both directions.

See also
Dedicated Intercity trains of India

References

External links

 Railroadair.blogspot.in
 Railnewscenter.com

Passenger trains originating from Varanasi
Passenger trains originating from Lucknow
Intercity Express (Indian Railways) trains